Standing on a Hummingbird is Mark Templeton's first full-length album, released February 2007. The album has the distinction of being the inaugural release on the New York ambient electronic label Anticipate Recordings.

Track listing
"Amidst Things Uncontrolled" – 5:00
"Pigeon Hurt" – 3.17
"Roots Growing" – 4:42
"From Verse to Verse" – 3:40
"Refrain From" – 1:04
"Tentative Growth" – 4:29
"Across From Golden (Remix)" – 5:05
"Standing on a Hummingbird" – 4:52
"Pattern for a Pillow" – 7:15
"Difficult to Light" – 5:02

External links
Mark Templeton's website
Anticipate Recordings' website
Boomkat review
Exclaim! review
Grooves link
Textura review

2007 albums
Mark Templeton (electronic musician) albums